Wyartite ·7H2O is a uranium bearing mineral named after Jean Wyart (1902–1992), mineralogist at the Sorbonne, Paris. It has greenish-black, black, or violet-black, translucent to opaque orthorhombic crystals. A hardness of 3 - 4 Mohs. Its other names are Ianthinite (of Bignand), Wyartit and Wyartita. It belongs to the uranium carbonate group of minerals. It is found next to rutherfordine in Shinkolobwe, Shaba, Zaire.

Determination of the structure of wyartite provided the first evidence for a pentavalent uranium mineral. Like all uranium minerals it is radioactive.

References

Uranium minerals
Calcium minerals
Carbonate minerals
Orthorhombic minerals
Minerals in space group 19
Uranium(V) compounds
Uranyl compounds